Plochman's is an American brand of mustard that is made by the Plochman, Inc., company based in Manteno, Illinois. It is most recognized by its barrel shaped bottle.

Founded in 1852 as Premium Mustard Mills in Chicago, it was later acquired by Moritz Plochman (a trained chemist and emigrant from Württemberg). In 1957 it began selling mustard in the now famous yellow squeeze barrel. It was the first successful squeeze condiment in the United States. Still based in the Chicago area, Plochman's is one of the top five brands of mustard in the United States. Plochman's sell a variety of mustard condiments from classic American yellow, stone ground, spicy, Dijon, beer, Kosciusko, horseradish, and even Cuban and sweet fig. Plochman's motto is "the true Mustard Lover's Mustard".

See also
 List of mustard brands

References

External links 
Company website

Brand name condiments
Mustard brands
History of Chicago
Companies based in Kankakee County, Illinois
American brands
1852 establishments in Illinois
Condiment companies of the United States